is a Japanese airline based in Kirishima, Kagoshima Prefecture. It operates feeder services in support of Japan Airlines and All Nippon Airways. Its main base is Kagoshima Airport, with hubs at Osaka International Airport, Amami Airport and Fukuoka Airport. JAC is owned by Japan Airlines (60%) and 12 local municipalities of the Amami Islands and Kagoshima (40%).

History 

The airline was established on 1 July 1983 and started operations in December 1983. A joint investment plan with public and private investors in fourteen Kagoshima Prefecture municipalities established Japan Air Commuter. At the time JAC was an affiliate of Toa Domestic Airlines, later known as Japan Air System. Japan Air System later merged into Japan Airlines.

In the 1990s JAC had its headquarters in the Kagoshima Airport Building Annex in Mizobe, Aira District, Kagoshima Prefecture.

In October 2019, JAC, Japan Airlines, All Nippon Airways, Oriental Air Bridge, and Amakusa Airlines formed EAS LLP, a limited liability partnership, as an alliance among the three Kyushu regional carriers, with the aim of consolidating safety and technical operations, sales promotions, procurement, personnel, and other functions. JAC began code sharing with All Nippon Airways in October 2022, with certain flights carrying both ANA and JAL flight numbers.

JAC joined Oneworld as an affiliate member in October 2020.

Destinations

Japan Air Commuter operates to the following destinations (as of January 2020):

Fleet 

As of July 2022, the Japan Air Commuter fleet includes the following aircraft:

Former fleet

Japan Air Commuter has previously operated the following aircraft:

References

External links

Japan Air Commuter (Japanese)

Regional airlines of Japan
Japan Airlines
Airlines established in 1983
Companies based in Kagoshima Prefecture
Japanese companies established in 1983